Walter Stubbings (4 September 1870 — 28 November 1949) was an English cricketer who played for Derbyshire in 1900.

Stubbings was born in Whitwell, Derbyshire, the son of James Stubbings, a mason, and his wife Ann. He made just one first-class appearance for the Derbyshire side, in a match against Essex during the 1900 season. Stubbings bowled uneconomically, and his only batting contribution was a second innings tally of 9 not out.

Stubbings' brother, James, fourteen years his senior, played in five first-class matches during the 1880s.

Stubbings died in Wakefield at the age of 79.

References

1870 births
1949 deaths
English cricketers
Derbyshire cricketers
People from Whitwell, Derbyshire
Cricketers from Derbyshire